Dallas Wayne (born 1956) is a singer, songwriter, voice-over artist and on-air radio personality for SiriusXM Satellite Radio. A native of Springfield, Missouri, he grew up in Branson, Missouri and Cape Girardeau, Missouri. Dallas began performing professionally while in high school.

He moved to Nashville, in 1975 where he further developed his vocal style singing demos for many of the top publishing houses in the music industry.  His roommate in Nashville was Dennis Morgan (songwriter).

While touring Europe in the early 90s, Dallas forged a deal with Texicalli Records in Finland and was signed to record an album. He went on to record six albums. Later, he moved to Scandinavia, where he became a staff writer for Warner/Chappell Music.

After four years living and touring in Europe, Dallas returned to the U.S. and signed a record deal with HighTone Records. In addition to recording two albums of his own on the HighTone label, Dallas was a part of the honky-tonk supergroup the TwangBangers.

Dallas moved to Austin in 2003; two years later, he released the CD I'm Your Biggest Fan on the Koch Records Nashville label. In 2009, Dallas released the album I'll Take the Fifth on Smith Entertainment records. Dallas also performed with the legendary country band Heybale from 2011 to 2020 every Sunday night at The Continental Club in Austin.

In 2016 and 2018, respectively, Dallas recorded the albums Songs the Jukebox Taught Me and Songs the Jukebox Taught Me Volume 2 which were released on the Heart of Texas Records' label. With these albums, Dallas pays tribute to his classic country music heroes and teachers in a fresh collection of standards featuring some well-known special guests, including Willie Nelson and Jeannie Seely.

In addition, Jeannie Seely and Willie Nelson recorded a song that Dallas wrote called "Not a Dry Eye in the House", which was released as a radio single on Curb Records in 2021.

Dallas' most recent album is "Coldwater, Tennessee" - an all-original project released in April 2022 by BFD/Audium Nashville and distributed exclusively through The Orchard.

Dallas currently resides in Bristol, TN, where he pursues his radio career, songwriting and touring.

Radio shows
Dallas Wayne can be heard on Sirius XM Satellite Radio, Monday through Friday from noon to 6 p.m. Eastern at Willie's Roadhouse (channel 59), Tuesday through Friday in Outlaw Country (channel 60) from 10 a.m. to noon Eastern, and on Sunday from 10 a.m. to noon Eastern at Willie's Roadhouse.

Awards
The Academy of Western Artists presented Dallas with a Will Rogers Award for Classic Country Major Market DJ of the Year in 2006 for his work at KHYI 95.3 FM in Dallas, Texas. He received a second Will Rogers Award in 2009 for DJ of the Year, this time in recognition of his work at Sirius XM Satellite Radio.

The Ameripolitan Music Awards named Dallas the DJ of the year in 2014. The same year, Dallas received the Ameripolitan Honky Tonk Group of the year award as part of the band Heybale! 

Dallas was inducted into the Texas Country Music Hall of Fame's Disc Jockey Hall of Fame in 2015.

In 2018, Dallas was awarded the CMA of Texas Choice Award (formerly CMA of Texas Hall of Fame).

Dallas and Heybale! were named the Academy of Western Artists’ Pure Country Group of the Year in 2020.

Performance credits
Dallas' theater, TV and movie appearances include multiple performances on The Grand Ole Opry, Larry's Country Diner, TruCountry and the Country's Family Reunion Tribute to Merle Haggard. His acting credits include the national touring company of Harry Chapin's Cotton Patch Gospel; "Stanley Sanders" in the critically acclaimed musical Smoke on the Mountain; "Eddie" with the original Broadway cast of Pump Boys and Dinettes; and a movie narration in the award-winning satirical documentary The Joy Boys Story.

Discography

References

https://books.google.com/books?id=SxQEAAAAMBAJ&pg=PA42&lpg=PA42&dq=%22Dallas+Wayne%22+singer&source=bl&ots=1XfBAKqY4u&sig=olHZiAdu_K_91ncWgTv39TOthI4&hl=en&sa=X&ei=g1JuUI_6K8my0AH2m4DQDg&ved=0CDAQ6AEwAA#v=onepage&q=%22Dallas%20Wayne%22%20singer&f=false

External links
Official website
Heart of Texas Records
Heybale

Country musicians from Texas
Musicians from Austin, Texas
American country singer-songwriters
American male singer-songwriters
American radio personalities
Living people
Place of birth missing (living people)
Singer-songwriters from Texas
1956 births